The 2006 Liga Indonesia Premier Division Final was a football match which was played on 30 July 2006 at Manahan Stadium in Solo. It was contested by Persik and PSIS to determine the winner of the 2006 Liga Indonesia Premier Division. Persik won the match 1–0 after 120 minutes with Cristian Gonzáles scoring the winning goal for their second Premier Division title.

Road to the final

Match details

References

External links
Liga Indonesia Premier Division standings

2006